Mark Jenkins (born 1970) is an American artist who makes sculptural street installations. Jenkins' practice of street art is to use the "street as a stage" where his sculptures interact with the surrounding environment including passersby who unknowingly become actors. His installations often draw the attention of the police.  His work has been described as whimsical, macabre, shocking and situationist. Jenkins cites Juan Muñoz as his initial inspiration.

In addition to creating art, he also teaches his sculpture techniques and installation practices through workshops. He currently lives in Washington, DC.

Life and career 

Jenkins was born in Alexandria, Virginia, but first began experimenting with tape  as a casting medium for creating sculpture in 2003 while living in Rio de Janeiro. Wrapping the tape in reverse and then resealing it, he was able to make casts of objects including himself. One of his first street projects was a series of clear tape self casts that he installed on the streets of Rio de Janeiro.  Jenkins became immediately interested in the reactions of the people and considered his installation as much a social experiment as an art project.In 2004 he moved back to Washington DC and in 2005 he began working with Sandra Fernandez on the Storker Project, a series in which clear casts of toy babies are installed in different cities to interact with their surrounding environment.  Jenkins and Fernandez continued to create other installations using tape animals--dogs playing in litter, giraffes nibbling plastic bags from trees, and ducks swimming in gutters. Other outdoor projects which explore culture jamming include Meterpops, Traffic-Go-Round, and Signs of Spring.Signs of Spring Laughing Squid, March 31, 2008

In 2006 Jenkins began the Embed Series. The tape casts were filled with newspaper and cement and dressed to create hyper realistic sculptural duplicates of himself and Fernandez. These new lifelike sculpture installations created confusion causing some passers-by to make calls to 911 which caused police and sometimes rescue units to arrive on his "stage".A Minute With: Street artist Mark Jenkins Reuters, February 1, 2012

In 2008    Jenkins collaborated with Greenpeace on an awareness campaign, Plight of the Polar Bears, to draw attention to the melting Arctic ice caps. Jenkins created realistic figures appearing to be homeless people but with plush polar bear heads. The installations resulted in bomb squads being deployed to destroy the works subsequently creating controversy over the regulation of public space in the post 9/11 era.Homeless Polar Bears Ask for Change The Huffington Post, September 17, 2008

Jenkins has participated in public art events Interferencia (Barcelona, 2008), BELEF (Belgrade, 2009), Dublin Contemporary 2011,  Inside Out (Southeastern Center for Contemporary Art, Winston-Salem, 2009), Living Layers (Rome, 2012), Les Vraisemblables (Nuit Blanche, Paris, 2014), Passages Insolites (Ex Muro, Quebec City 2021) Embed Bodies (Un Été au Havre, Le Havre, 2022).  

Indoors Jenkins has exhibited internationally in galleries and museums as well as continuing his Embed Series in public settings such as cafeterias, schools and building lobbies. Solo shows  include Glazed Paradise at Diesel Gallery (Tokyo, 2008), Meaning is Overrated at Carmichael Gallery (Los Angeles, 2009), Terrible Horrible at Ruttkowski;68 Gallery (Cologne, 2014), Moment of Impact at Lazarides Gallery (London, 2015), and Remix at L'Arsenal (Montreal, 2016).

In 2018, he and Fernandez created Project84, in London, England. The work was designed to raise awareness of adult male suicide.

Commercially, Jenkins collaborated with the fashion brand Balenciaga at stores including Colette  and Selfridges.

In November 2022, Jenkins was commissioned by Steve Lazarides to make a replica of his sister Kristina passed out in a bowl of soup for his gallery, which subsequently resulted in police breaking down the gallery doors in a rescue attempt
Publications
Publication by Jenkins
 The Urban Theater: Mark Jenkins  (2012) 

Publications with contributions by Jenkins
 Hidden Track: How Visual Culture Is Going Places  (2007) 
 Tactile: High Touch Visuals (2007) 
 Street World: Urban Art and Culture from Five Continents  (2007) 
 Outsiders: Art by People  (2008) 
 Street Art: The Graffiti Revolution  (2008) 
 Untitled II. The Beautiful Renaissance: Street Art and Graffiti  (2009) 
 Modart No. 01: Forget Art: In Order to Feel It   (2010) 
 Urban Interventions: Personal Projects in Public Places  (2010) 
 Beyond the Street: The 100 Leading Figures in Urban Art  (2010) 
 The Art of Rebellion #3 (2010) 
 Street Art Cookbook: A Guide to Techniques and Materials (2011) 
 Art & Agenda: Political Art and Activism (2011) 
 Walls & Frames: Fine Art from the Streets (2011) 
 Trespass: A History Of Uncommissioned Urban Art'' (2011)

References

External links 
 Jenkins' website
 tapesculpture.org Mark Jenkins' tape sculpture tutorial
 Mark Jenkins: Tic Tac Toe (Positive-Propaganda Projects in Munich, 2013)
  Mark Jenkins: Holding Cell (Ruttkowski;68 video, 2012)
 Mark Jenkins: Go Figure! (Gestalten video, 2011)
 Tape Man  (Discovery Channel film, 2008)
 Reuters video feature (2006)
 Orange Houses and Tape Babies: Temporary and Nebulous Art in Urban Spaces (academic essay)

1970 births
Living people
Public art
American installation artists
20th-century American sculptors
Culture jamming
Artists from Washington, D.C.
21st-century American sculptors
People from Alexandria, Virginia